Boundary is a village in the civil parish of Forsbrook, in the Staffordshire Moorlands district, in the county of Staffordshire, England, near to the town of Cheadle. It is just outside of the city of Stoke-on-Trent. 

Villages in Staffordshire
Staffordshire Moorlands